Wuwei is a prefecture-level city in northwest central Gansu province. In the north it borders Inner Mongolia, in the southwest, Qinghai. Its central location between three western capitals, Lanzhou, Xining, and Yinchuan makes it an important business and transportation hub for the area. Because of its position along the Hexi Corridor, historically the only route from central China to western China and the rest of Central Asia, many major railroads and national highways pass through Wuwei.

History 

In ancient times, Wuwei was called Liangzhou (—the name retained by today's Wuwei's central urban district) and is the eastern terminus of the Hexi Corridor. People began settling here about 5,000 years ago. It was a key link for the Northern Silk Road, and a number of important archaeological finds were uncovered from Wuwei, including ancient copper carts with stone animals. The motifs and types of objects in the Wuwei graves, as well as their earthenware, lacquer, and bronze composition, constitute typical examples of the Han Chinese burial style that can be found all over China. Other graves found along the Hexi Corridor show Xiongnu and other minority influence, which are used to trace regimes such as the Northern Liang. It became an important provincial capital during the Former Han Dynasty as the Hou Hanshu makes clear:

"In the third year [170 CE], Meng Tuo, the Inspector of Liangzhou (modern Wuwei), sent the Assistant Officer Ren She, commanding five hundred soldiers from Dunhuang. He, with the Wuji Major Cao Kuan, and Chief Clerk of the Western Regions, Zhang Yan, brought troops from Yanqi (Karashahr), Qiuci (Kucha), and the Nearer and Further Kingdoms of Jushi (Turfan and Jimasa), altogether numbering more than 30,000, to punish Shule (Kashgar). They attacked the town of Zhenzhong (Arach) but, having stayed for more than forty days without being able to subdue it, they withdrew. Following this, the kings of Shule (Kashgar) killed one another repeatedly and, for its part, the Imperial Government was unable to prevent it."

In 121 BC Han emperor Wudi brought his cavalry here to defend the Hexi Corridor against the Xiongnu Huns. His military success allowed him to expand the corridor westward. Its importance as a stop along the Silk Road made it a crossroads of cultures and ethnic groups from all over central Asia. Numerous Buddhist grottoes and temples in the area attest to its role as a path for bringing Buddhism from India and Afghanistan to China.

During the Three Kingdoms period (184-280), Liangzhou was governed by Ma Teng. After the death of Ma Teng, Ma Chao assumed the post and governed the province for a short time before it fell into the hands of Cao Cao, ruler of Wei Kingdom.

Liangzhou was briefly (from 400 to 421) a state during the Sixteen Kingdoms period.

Famous cultural relics from Wuwei include the Galloping Bronze Horse, Western Xia mausoleums(), Wuwei White Towers Temple, Tianti Mountain Grotto, Luoshi(Kumārajīva) Temple, and the Confucian temple.

Geography and climate 
Wuwei is located in the Hexi Corridor between the Tibetan plateau and Mongolian Plateau. There are 2200–3000 sunlight hours each year and from 85–165 frost free days.

Minerals deposits occurring in the vicinity of Wuwei include graphite, iron, titanium, and limestone.

A species of stone loach, Triplophysa wuweiensis, is named after Wuwei where it was first discovered.

Administration

1 urban district, 2 counties, 1 autonomous county, 116 towns, and 41 townships

Demographics 
Population 1,815,054. Urban: 509,600 with 38 ethnic groups represented including Han, Hui, Mongol, Tu, Tibetan, etc.

Economy 
Consistent sunlight and fertile soil make agriculture one of Wuwei's biggest industries. Other important industries are textiles, metallurgy, and construction materials.  Melons, vegetables, wine and livestock are all major agricultural products. Organic farming is a trend with more land being set aside for “green farming” each year. Land use can be broken down into the following:

  of water
  of forest
  of grassland.
  of “undeveloped” land.
  of farmland.
  of corn
  of vegetables
  of melons
  for livestock
  of vineyards

Transport 
Wuwei is served by the G30 Lianyungang–Khorgas Expressway and China National Highway 312; the  serves trains on the Lanzhou-Xinjiang Railway.

Footnotes

References
Hill, John E. (2015) Through the Jade Gate to Rome - China to Rome. CreateSpace, Charleston, South Carolina. .

External links 

 Official website of Wuwei government
 Gansu Province Official Website

 
Prefecture-level divisions of Gansu
Populated places along the Silk Road